The Oriental Institute (OI), established in 1919, is the University of Chicago's interdisciplinary research center for ancient Near Eastern ("Orient") studies and archaeology museum. It was founded for the university by professor James Henry Breasted with funds donated by John D. Rockefeller, Jr.  It conducts research on ancient civilizations throughout the Near East, including at its facility, Chicago House, in Luxor, Egypt.  The institute publicly exhibits an extensive collection of artifacts related to ancient civilizations at its on-campus building in Hyde Park, Chicago.  According to anthropologist William Parkinson of the Field Museum, the OI's highly focused "near Eastern, or southwest Asian and Egyptian" collection is one of the finest in the world.

The museum's name is of some controversy, as the word "Oriental" in modern usage is considered confusing and potentially offensive. The museum plans to debut a new name and logo on April 4, 2023.

History

In the early 20th century, James Henry Breasted built up the collection of the university's Haskell Oriental Museum, which he oversaw along with his field work, and teaching duties. He dreamed, however, of establishing a research institute, “a laboratory for the study of the rise and development of civilization”, that would trace Western civilization to its roots in the ancient Middle East.

As World War I came toward a close, Breasted sensed an opportunity to use his influence in the new political climate to create opportunities for access to archaeology sites and their study. He wrote to John D. Rockefeller, Jr., and proposed the foundation of what would become the Oriental Institute. Fundamental to the implementation of his plan was a research trip through the Middle East, which Breasted had optimistically suggested was ready to receive scholars again after the disturbances of the war. Breasted received a reply from Rockefeller pledging $50,000 over five years for the Oriental Institute. Rockefeller also assured University of Chicago president Harry Pratt Judson that he would pledge another $50,000 to the cause. The University of Chicago contributed additional support, and in May 1919 the Oriental Institute was founded. The institute is housed in an unusual Art-Deco/Gothic building at the corner of 58th Street and University Avenue, which was designed by the architectural firm Mayers Murray & Phillip. Construction was completed in 1930, and the building was dedicated in 1931.

In the 1990s, Tony Wilkinson, founded the 'Center for Ancient Middle Eastern Landscapes' based at the institute. Its role is to investigate the Middle East through landscape archaeology and the analysis of spatial data, including images from many decades of Middle Eastern aerial photography, and survey maps, as well as, modern satellite imagery.

Research and collection

The Museum of the Oriental Institute has artifacts from digs in Egypt, Israel, Syria, Turkey, Iraq, and Iran. Notable works in the collection include the famous Megiddo Ivories; various treasures from Persepolis, the old Persian capital; a collection of Luristan Bronzes; a colossal 40-ton human-headed winged bull (or Lamassu) from Khorsabad, the capital of Sargon II; and a monumental statue of King Tutankhamun.  The museum has free admission, although visitors are encouraged to donate.

The Oriental Institute is a center of active research on the ancient Near East. The building's upper floors contain a library, classrooms and faculty offices, and its gift shop, the Suq, also sells textbooks for the university's classes on Near Eastern studies. In addition to carrying out many digs in the Fertile Crescent, OI scholars have made contributions to the understanding of the origins of human civilization. The term "Fertile Crescent" was coined by J. H. Breasted, the OI founder, who popularized the connection of the rise of civilization in the Near East with the development of European culture.

In 2011, among other projects OI scholars completed publication of the 21-volume Chicago Assyrian Dictionary, a basic cultural reference work. The effort was begun in 1921 by J. H. Breasted, and continued by Edward Chiera and Ignace Gelb, with the first volume published in 1956.  Dr. Erica Reiner as editor-in-charge led the research teams for 44 years. She was succeeded by Dr. Martha T. Roth, dean of humanities at the university. Similar dictionaries are under way, including the Chicago Hittite Dictionary and the Chicago Demotic Dictionary.

Chicago House
The Institute oversees the work of Chicago House in Luxor, Egypt.  The Egyptian facility, established in 1924, performs the Epigraphic Survey, which documents and researches the historical sites in Luxor. It also manages conservation at various sites.

Persian tablets lawsuit

In 2006, the Oriental Institute was the center of a controversy when a U.S. federal court lawsuit sought to seize and auction a valuable collection of ancient Persian tablets held by the museum. The proceeds were to compensate the victims of a 1997 bombing in Ben Yehuda Street, Jerusalem, an attack which the United States claimed was funded by Iran. The ruling threatened sale of an invaluable collection of ancient clay tablets, held by the Oriental Institute since the 1930s, but owned by Iran. The Achaemenid (or Persepolis) clay tablets were loaned for study to the University of Chicago in 1937. They were uncovered in Persepolis, Iran by Chicago archaeologists in 1933 and are legally the property of the National Museum of Iran and the Iran's Cultural Heritage Organization. The artifacts were loaned for study based on the understanding that they would be returned to Iran, which the OI had done in batches over the years. The tablets, from Persepolis, the capital of the Achaemenid Empire, date to about 500 BCE.

The tablets give a view of daily life, itemizing such elements as the daily rations of barley given to workers in nearby regions of the empire. The tablets were sent to the capital to provide a record of what they were paying workers. Gil Stein, former director of the Oriental Institute, said that details largely concern food for people on diplomatic or military missions. Each tablet is about half the size of a deck of playing cards and has characters of a dialect of Elamite, an extinct language understood by perhaps a dozen scholars in the world.

Stein described the tablets as providing "the first chance to hear the Persians speaking of their own empire". Charles Jones, Research Associate and Librarian at the Oriental Institute and tablet expert, compared them to "credit card receipts". Most current knowledge about the ancient Persian empire comes from the accounts of others, most famously the Greek storyteller Herodotus. Stein added: "It's valuable because it's a group of tablets, thousands of them from the same archive. It's like the same filing cabinet. They're very, very valuable scientifically." The Oriental Institute had been returning them to Iran in small batches. Since the 1930s, the institute had returned several hundred tablets and fragments to Iran and were preparing another shipment when the legal action began. An appeals court later overturned the order, and in 2018, the United States Supreme Court affirmed the subsequent ruling that the collection cannot be taken from the Oriental Institute to satisfy the judgment.

Directors

List of directors:
 1919–1935: James Henry Breasted; inaugural director
 1936–1946: John A. Wilson
 1950–1960: Carl Hermann Kraeling
 1962–1968: Robert McCormick Adams Jr.
 1968–1972: George R. Hughes
 1972–1981: John A. Brinkman
 1981–1983: Robert McCormick Adams Jr. (second term)
 1983–1989: Janet H. Johnson
 1989–1997: William Marvin Sumner
 1997–2002: Gene B. Gragg
 2002–2017: Gil Stein
 2017–2021: Christopher Woods
 2021–present: Theo Van Den Hout (Interim Director)

See also

 Papyrus Oxyrhynchus 54
 Papyrus Oxyrhynchus 69
 Papyrus Oxyrhynchus 72
 Papyrus Oxyrhynchus 75

Gallery

References

External links

 The Oriental Institute in Google Cultural Institute
Abzu – A guide to open access material of the Ancient Near East
A database on the Oriental Institute's website maintained by Dr. Clemens Reichel documenting artifacts stolen from the Iraq Museum in April 2003
Persepolis Fortification Archive Project
The Oriental Institute: Fragments for a History of an Institution. A collaborative project intended to focus ideas and thoughts on the history of the Oriental Institute of The University of Chicago

1919 establishments in Illinois
Ancient Near East organizations
Archaeological museums in Illinois
Art museums and galleries in Chicago
Oriental Institute
Hyde Park, Chicago
Museums established in 1919
Museums of Ancient Near East in the United States
Oriental studies
University museums in Illinois
University of Chicago
Research institutes of the University of Chicago